Nicholas Bagenal or Bagenall (1629–1712) was an English MP for Anglesey, Wales.

Life
Nicholas Bagenal was born in Bath, Somerset, the son of Arthur Bagenal and Magdalene Trevor, daughter of Sir Richard Trevor of Trevalyn, Denbighshire. He was the grandson of Henry Bagenal, Marshal of the Army in Ireland. He owned estates at Plas Newydd in Anglesey and in Newry, County Down.

Bagenal was a commissioner of Assessment for Anglesey (1647–1648, 1660–1680), for Caernarvon (1660–1663, 1664–1680), and for Anglesey and Caernarvon (1689–1690). He was elected MP for Anglesey in 1661, and was a Deputy Lieutenant (1661–?1680, 1689–1712) and Custos Rotulorum for Anglesey (1689-1690). He was elected a Fellow of the Royal Society in 1664.

Legacy
On Nicholas Bagenal's death with no surviving heirs, the family estates at Anglesey and Newry passed respectively to his cousins, Edward Bayly and Robert Needham, and ultimately to the Marquess of Anglesey and the Earl of Kilmorey. He had married twice, firstly to Sidney Grosvenor, daughter of Sir Robert Grosvenor of Eaton, Cheshire, and secondly to Lady Anne Charlotte Bruce, daughter of Robert Bruce, 1st Earl of Ailesbury and Lady Diana Grey, with whom he had a daughter, Elizabeth Bagenal, who predeceased him.

References

 

1629 births
1712 deaths
People from Bath, Somerset
English MPs 1661–1679
Fellows of the Royal Society